Parhelia may refer to:

 Parhelia (phenomenon), the scientific name for sun dogs
 Matrox Parhelia, a series of computer graphics processors